River Falls may refer to:

United States
 River Falls, Alabama
 River Falls Township, Minnesota
 River Falls, Wisconsin
 River Falls (town), Wisconsin

See also 
 Thief River Falls, Minnesota
 Black River Falls, Wisconsin
 River des Chutes (River of the Falls), drains the municipalities of Saint-Narcisse and Saint-Stanislas, Quebec, Canada